Horta-Guinardó is the name of one of the districts of Barcelona, located in its North-Eastern corner. It is named after two very heterogeneous areas of the city, Horta and el Guinardó, which together cover a large area of 11.92 km², amounting to 11.9% of the total area of the city.

A former municipality that eventually became part of the city in the late 19th century, it is bordered by five out of ten districts of Barcelona (Gràcia, Nou Barris, Eixample, Sant Andreu and Sant Martí), and by two other municipalities of the metropolitan area (Sant Cugat and Cerdanyola del Vallès). It underwent rapid urbanisation process from the 1950s.

Territory and demographics
Total inhabitants amounted to 169,920 in the 2005 census. As the third largest district in the city (after Sants-Montjuïc and Sarrià-Sant Gervasi), it is not one of the most densely populated parts of the city, although its population is actually in decline. It is known for the steepness of its streets, which is due to the hilly landscape in this area of Barcelona, surrounded by the hills of Collserola, Vall d'Hebron and Riera d'Horta.

Neighbourhoods
El Guinardó
El Baix Guinardó
Can Baró
La Font d'en Fargues
El Carmel
La Teixonera (also spelt Taxonera)
La Clota
Horta
La Vall d'Hebron
Montbau
Sant Genís dels Agudells

See also
Serra de Collserola

 Street names in Barcelona
 Urban planning of Barcelona

External links

City Council of Barcelona page for Horta-Guinardó 

 
Districts of Barcelona